Boygiri is a 2017 Hindi web series, created and produced by Tanveer Bookwala for the video on demand platform ALTBalaji. The web series is about six friends whose lives are filled with adventures and crazy moments.

The series is available for streaming on the ALT Balaji App and its associated websites since its release date.

Plot
The series revolves around six grown men, Manjot Bhasin (Adhaar Khurrana), Bandan Singh (Ajeet Singh Palawat), Bajirao Ghadigoankar (Amey Wagh), Advait Malhotra (Chaitnya Sharma), Pragnesh Wakharia (Divyang Thakkar) and Ravi Sinha (Mantra) who refuse to let go of two things in their life: their friendship and their Boygiri! The series explores their lives where there is a new adventure and every moments are crazy with uninhibited fun with their friends.

Cast
 Adhaar Khurrana as Manjot Bhasin
 Ajeet Singh Palawat as  Bandan Singh
 Amey Wagh as Bajirao Ghadigoankar
 Chaitnya Sharma as Advait Malhotra
 Divyang Thakkar as Pragnesh Wakharia
 Mantra Mugdh as Ravi Sinha
 Radhika Bangia
 Rashi Mal
 Sarthak Kakkar
 Shonita Joshi as Mandeep Bhasin

List of episodes
 Episode 1: The Reunion
 Episode 2: The Night Out
 Episode 3: The Cricket Match
 Episode 4: The Donation
 Episode 5: The Dead Guy
 Episode 6: The Photoshoot
 Episode 7: The Nervous Bride
 Episode 8: The Birthday Party
 Episode 9: The Music Video
 Episode 10: Season Finale - The Reboot

References

External links
 
 

2017 web series debuts
Hindi-language web series
Indian LGBT-related web series
ALTBalaji original programming
Indian comedy web series